Vestlandshallen is an indoor arena in Bergen, Norway. It has a capacity of 5,000-9,000 people.

It usually hosts various indoor sporting events as well as music concerts.

External links
 Website
 Vestlandshallen homepage

Indoor arenas in Norway